Improvisational theatre companies, also known as improv troupes or improv groups, are the primary practitioners of improvisational theater. Modern companies exist around the world and at a range of skill levels. Most groups make little or no money, while a few, well-established groups are profitable.

Although improvisational theater has existed in some form or another since the 16th century, modern improv began with the teachings of Viola Spolin in Chicago, Illinois, USA and Keith Johnstone during the 1940-50s in Calgary, Alberta, Canada. Spolin's teachings led to the creation of The Compass Players, the first modern improvisational theater company, in 1955. The presence of The Compass Players, The Second City, and ImprovOlympic in Chicago created a strength in the form within the city that continues to this day. New York City, San Francisco, Los Angeles, and Toronto are other major hubs of improvisational theater in the North America.

Many companies host improvisational theatre festivals or give improvisational theatre classes. Professional groups often perform a regular stage show acted by the most senior members. Along with this, they host "house" improv teams made up of improv students or graduates from their classes. In the past decade, professional improvisational theater groups have gradually started working more with corporate clients, using improvisational games to improve productivity and communication in the workplace.

Major Professional companies have branches in more than one city, have touring groups, and/or host large-scale improvisational comedy schools. Professional troupes are those not affiliated with a university or secondary school. Collegiate groups are those associated with a post-secondary educational institution. If a company performs more than one type of improvisational comedy, they are defined as using Multiple improvisational comedy types. If it is unclear what particular kind of improvisational comedy a group performs, they are defined as Improvisational. Those marked Semi-improvisational generally perform shows that are partially improvised and partially scripted.

The following is a list of noteworthy improvisational theatre companies from around the world.

Improvisational theatre companies in Canada

Improvisational theatre companies in the United States

*This group is no longer performing.

Improvisational theatre companies in the United Kingdom

Improvisational theatre companies in Asia

*This group is no longer performing.

Improvisational theatre companies in other regions

See also

 Commedia dell'arte
 List of comedians
 List of improvisational theater festivals

Notes

External links
improv groups worldwide

References

Theatre
Improvisational